The Daii or Dhay'yi are an indigenous Australian people of the Northern Territory.

Name
The tribal ethnonym Daii is formed from the demonstrative pronoun for 'this'.

Country
In Norman Tindale's estimation the Daii occupied  of land, extending northwards from the shores of Blue Mud Bay as far as the Koolatong River. Their inland extension ran at least to Ngilipidji.

Social organization
The Daii consisted of two clans, which formed the basis for marriage exchanges:-
 Dalwangu
 Djawark

The Dalwangu moiety was jiritja, the Djawark a dua moiety.

Trade
The Daii's lands accessed the rich quartzite quarry at Ngilipidji, which provided stone for prized implements that could be traded. The local industry was, according to archaeologists, probably spurred by the rise of precolonial contacts with Asia'sSouth Sulawesi Makassar voyagers.

Alternative names
 Taii
 Tai
 Dalwango
 Dalwongo
 Dalwongu
 Darlwongo
 Dhalwangu
 Djawark
 Djarlwa:g

Notes

Citations

Sources

Aboriginal peoples of the Northern Territory